R700 may refer to:

 R700 (South Africa), a Regional Route between Hoopstad and Bloemfontein
 Radeon R700, a graphics processing unit
 Remington 700, a bolt-action rifle
 R-700 Refrigerant, a non-organic refrigerant series